This is a list of film festivals in Italy.

Italy

External links
 Movie festivals and events worldwide at the Internet Movie Database
 International Film Festival Database
 FilmFestivals.com
 Ominous Events: The Horror Fests and Cons Database
 Directory of International Film Festivals

Film
Italy
Italy
Film

it:Lista dei festival cinematografici